Tunbosun Aiyedehin (born June 19, 1973), popularly known as Tuby, is a Nigerian film actress and voice-over artiste. She is best known for her role in the movies, Two Brides and a Baby and Kpians: The Feast of Soul.

Life
Tunbosun Aiyedehin resides in Lagos State. Aiyedehin is a graduate of Business Administration from Ahmadu Bello University.

Career
She joined the Nigerian film industry now known as Nollywood in the early 2000s. 
Aiyedehin has  featured in Nigerian television series films including Hakkunde, Troubled Waters, Moth to a Flame, Hell or High Water, Lockdown, Dear Bayo, Mrs. & Mrs. Johnson and The Ten Virgins.
She won Best Supporting Actress in a Drama at the 2016 Africa Magic Viewers Choice Awards, and Best Actress in a Supporting Role (English) at 2019 Best of Nollywood Awards.  A 2020 nominee in the Toronto International Film Festival as best supporting actress. She was also on set for a romantic drama titled Hey You.

Filmography

For Maria Ebun Pataki (2020)

Awards

References

External links

1969 births
Living people
Lagos State University alumni
20th-century Nigerian actresses
21st-century Nigerian actresses
Nigerian film actresses